Radio Proto is a privately owned radio broadcasting station in Cyprus. It was launched on September 3, 1990 in the capital Nicosia, but now has island-wide coverage. It belongs to the DIAS Group.

History
The radio station which is based in Strovolos went on the air on 3 September 1990. Radio Proto transmits on three FM frequencies 99.3 (national coverage), 89.4 (for Paphos, and Larnaca) and 87.9 (for Limassol and Famagusta).

The first successful morning program was presented by Giorgos Gravaris every day from 06:00 to 09:00. Also noteworthy are the presenters and producers, that were with the station from the start, including Stella Sourmeli, Roula Georgiadou, John Vickers, Zacharias Philippides, Stavros Sideras, Yianna Loizidou, Yiannis Adilinis, Dimitris Kallergis, Lazaros Mavros and Maria Sfetsou whose jointly-presented program, was extremely successful.

Presenters & Producers
Alexandros Parisis
Giota Damianou
Andreas Dimitropoulos
Maria Gunther
Erodotos Miltiadous
Giorgos Karampatakis
Lazaros Mavros
Christos Mixalaros
Eleftheria Andreou
Marios Poullados
Petros Athanasiou
Kristiana Georgiou

References

Radio stations in Cyprus
Radio stations established in 1990